The Videogame Rating Council (V.R.C.) was introduced by Sega of America in 1993 to rate all video games that were released for sale in the United States and Canada on the Sega Master System, Genesis, Game Gear, Sega CD, 32X, and Pico. The rating had to be clearly displayed on the front of the box, but their appearance in advertisements for the video game was strictly optional. It was later supplanted by the industry-wide Entertainment Software Rating Board.

History 

As the 16-bit era of video games began in the late 1980s, their content became more realistic. The increased graphical and audio fidelity of the products made violent scenes appear more explicit, especially those containing blood.  As controversy stemmed around the realism of this violence, 1992 games Mortal Kombat and Night Trap entered the limelight. Mortal Kombat is a "brutal" fighting game and Night Trap is a full-motion video Sega CD game where players protect a slumber party from vampires. The games were at the center of federal hearings held from December 9, 1993, to March 4, 1994 by United States senators Joseph Lieberman and Herb Kohl. . One quote that explains how Lieberman felt about video games during one of these trials is “Instead of enriching a child’s mind... these games teach a child to enjoy inflicting torture.”. As a result, the video game industry was given a year to create its own classification system or to otherwise have one imposed on them by the federal government. In May 1993, British censors banned Night Trap from being sold to children under 15 years old in the United Kingdom, which was an influence on Sega's decision to create an age rating system.

Prior to the hearings, Sega had become aware of rumblings from politicians that video game content was being scrutinized. As Sega was preparing to release the controversial Mortal Kombat for the Sega Genesis, the company worked to create its own rating system so that they would be able to market Mortal Kombat as a mature game not intended for children. Sega initially tried to license the Motion Picture Association of America's (MPAA) own rating system, but the MPAA refused. Instead, Sega created its own Videogame Rating Council (VRC) and revealed its existence on May 24, 1993. The council consisted of experts in education, psychology, and sociology as appointed by Sega. The VRC was one of several ratings groups to appear (among them, 3DO's 3DO Rating System). The VRC classified games that worked with Sega's consoles into three categories based on age: GA ("general audiences"), MA-13 ("mature audiences"), and MA-17 ("for adults"). It was criticized by journalists and consumer groups for vagueness and inconsistency, and other companies did not want Sega to be in charge of the ratings organization. This was particularly true for Nintendo, which was in rivalry with Sega in the North American video game market at this time. The lead editorial in the January 1994 issue of Electronic Gaming Monthly also criticized Sega for failing to inform and educate the public on the ratings system, particularly noting that the ratings appeared on the game boxes but usually not in advertisements for the games, and that most parents "either haven't a clue as to what [Sega's ratings] mean, don't know that they exist, or don't know why the game got the rating."

Following the hearings, the games industry created the Interactive Digital Software Association in April 1994, which made a proposal for a rating system. The proposal was adopted by the United States Congress in July 1994 and the Entertainment Software Rating Board (ESRB) was founded in September to execute the plan. The VRC ultimately folded that year when replaced by the ESRB. VRC ratings had been used on several hundred games made by Sega and others.

Ratings 

The three different ratings were as follows:
The rating symbols appear above in their standard black and white format, but were typically recolored when appearing on actual box art.

Before the Videogame Rating Council
While rival console manufacturer Nintendo enforced strict content guidelines for games released on its hardware in North America, Sega differentiated itself with a more liberal content policy, allowing for the depiction of blood and graphic violence in software released on its home consoles, provided that the publisher label the game's packaging with a generic "Parental Advisory" warning.

Such an advisory was put on the packaging for the following games: Techno Cop, Splatterhouse 2, Death Duel.

However, nudity and other sexual content remained taboo.  Games made for Sega systems generally toned down sexual content.

The nude fairies found in Stormlord were given some scantily clad attire when the game was ported over to the Sega Genesis.

Similarly, when Sega localized Phantasy Star II for western consumers, it edited dialogue in the game to obscure a non-playable character's homosexuality.

Notable cases

Mortal Kombat
The video game company Acclaim brought Mortal Kombat to the Genesis and Super NES in 1993. Both Sega and Nintendo ordered the game's graphic violence and blood to be toned down.

However, Sega allowed the player to restore the controversial content with a secret code, announced the creation of the Videogame Rating Council and gave Mortal Kombat an MA-13 rating. The result was that the Sega Genesis version of Mortal Kombat outsold the Super NES version. However, the commercial success of the game, including a marketing campaign by Acclaim to prepare consumers for "Mortal Monday", and the fact that the Videogame Rating Council opened the doorway for games to be sold on a Sega console system with adult content promoted national outrage.

Notes and references 

 Notes

 References

 Sources

External links 

 

1993 establishments in the United States
1994 disestablishments in the United States
Arts and media trade groups
Entertainment rating organizations
Self-censorship
Video game content ratings systems
Video game organizations
Video gaming in the United States